Hasan Bolbol (also Romanized as Ḩasan Bolbol; also known as Ḩasanābād) is a village in Qalandarabad Rural District, Qalandarabad District, Fariman County, Razavi Khorasan Province, Iran. At the 2006 census, its population was 80, in 20 families.

References 

Populated places in Fariman County